Liberty Square is a neighborhood in Baltimore, Maryland. African Americans make up the vast majority of residents.

Sub-division profile
Median household income: $30,665 (2011)
Median household rent: $464 (2011)
Average household size: (2.9 people)
The majority of residents in this neighborhood have an educational attainment less than a College Bachelor's degree.

See also
 List of Baltimore neighborhoods

References

External links

Liberty Square - Baltimore, MD - Niche

African-American history in Baltimore
Poverty in Maryland
Neighborhoods in Baltimore
Northwest Baltimore
Working-class culture in Baltimore